Wandering with the Moon is a 1945 Swedish drama film directed by Hasse Ekman.

Plot summary
A young man, Dan, leaves his home after a quarrel with his father. He starts to wander along the country road. During his walk he meets a travelling theatre company and falls in love with a young actress, Pia. Together they leave the theatre company, meeting a string of different people while they ponder over life and love together.

Cast
Eva Henning - Pia Serner, actress  
Alf Kjellin - Dan Killander
Stig Järrel - The vagabonde
Olof Molander - Fritz Diebolt, adventurer 
Hasse Ekman - Ernst Törsleff, Johannes' adoptive son 
Margit Manstad - Marie Ohdén, actress 
Karl-Arne Holmsten - Lieutenant Ekberg
Marianne Löfgren - Valborg Snäckendal
Sigge Fürst - Hugo Snäckendal
Hjördis Petterson - Ms. Linda Fristedt
Anna-Lisa Baude - Ms. Lola Oskarsson
Hilding Gavle - Johannes Törsleff, vicar
Douglas Håge - Alfredsson, driver 
Margot Ryding - Edit, Johannes' sister
Signe Wirff - Tora, Johannes' sister 
Olle Hilding - Dan's father

References

External links

1945 films
Films directed by Hasse Ekman
1940s Swedish-language films
Swedish romantic drama films
1945 romantic drama films
Swedish black-and-white films
1940s Swedish films